WBYG is a Country formatted broadcast radio station licensed to Point Pleasant, West Virginia, serving Point Pleasant, Mason County in West Virginia and Gallia County in Ohio.  WBYG is owned and operated by Baker Family Stations.

The call letters were formerly held by an AM radio station at 1450 kHz in Savannah, Georgia (now silent).

External links
 Big Country 99.5 Online
 

WBYG was also 99.9 FM based in Kankakee Illinois owned by Howard S. Dybedock who made the station much bigger when he built a new Transmission tower in 1977 near Crete, Illinois and increased power to 50,000 watts to reach the Chicago Market. At that time it was a top 40/pop station with Greg Shelby, Allan Kaye, Bill Taylor and others.

BYG
BYG
Radio stations established in 1995
Point Pleasant, West Virginia